Cheng Ho Cultural Museum is a museum about the life of Zheng He in Malacca City, Malacca, Malaysia.

History
The museum was founded and opened in 2006 by Tan Ta Sen, who is also the president of International Zheng He Society.

Architecture
The museum is the largest in the state; it covers a total floor area of 5,110 m; divided into three levels and occupies eight units of old shop houses. Some of the shops were built before 1786. A drum and a bell tower are located in front of the museum.

The museum building is believed to sit at the original site of the warehouse complex Guan Chang, built by Zheng He around 600 years ago to temporarily store goods he acquired during his travels. The warehouse complex originally occupied 10 acres of lowland along the northern bank of Malacca River. Five Ming-era wells were unearthed during the museum's construction.

Exhibitions
The museum exhibits the life of Zheng He and his world voyage in his fleets. It displays his travel with big pictures of Chinese history. The museum can roughly be divided into several sections, which are: Old Malacca Village, Ship Gallery, Treasure Ship, Antique Gallery and Garden Courtyard. It opens everyday from 9.00 a.m. to 06.30 p.m.

See also
 List of museums in Malaysia
 List of tourist attractions in Malacca
 Gallery of Admiral Cheng Ho

References

2006 establishments in Malaysia
Buildings and structures in Malacca City
Museums established in 2006
Museums in Malacca